Lubang Jeriji Saleh is a limestone cave complex in Indonesia in the Sangkulirang-Mangkalihat Karst located in the remote jungle of Bengalon district in East Kutai, East Kalimantan province on Borneo island. In a 2018 publication a team of researchers announced to have found the then-oldest known work of figurative art in the world among the cave paintings, at 40,000 years old. However, the same team has since found and dated an elaborate therianthrope rock art panel in the Leang Bulu’ Sipong 4 cave in Sulawesi's Maros-Pangkep karst to around 44,000 years old, older than the figurative art in Lubang Jeriji Saleh.

Cave paintings
The Lubang Jeriji Saleh site is one among many caves, embedded in the steep mountains of East Kalimantan. Its walls and ceiling covered with hundreds of outlines of hands and outstretched fingers inside bursts of red-orange ochre or iron oxide paint and figurative cave paintings. An updated analysis of the cave walls suggests, that the oldest of the finger stencils are 52,000 years old and the earliest actual painting, a depiction of a banteng bull, was created around 40,000 years ago, tens of thousands of years earlier than previous datings.

Based on 2018 Uranium datings of small samples of the limestone crust, three phases of decoration were identified. The oldest contains the bull depiction and red-orange ochre hand stencils. During the second phase stencils in a mulberry colour along with intricate motifs and humans were created. Human figures, boats and geometric designs were identified as the work of the third and youngest phase.

Investigation
The Kalimantan caves were explored in 1994 and the paintings first spotted by French caver Luc-Henri Fage. Lubang Jeriji Saleh (first called Ilas Kenceng in the Kalimanthrope publications) was discovered by Pindi Setiawan, Luc-Henri Fage and Jean-Michel Chazine in September 1998, guided by Pak Saleh, a Dayak swallow nest hunter. The surveys and the study of the paintings were carried out during three following missions. This vast fossil cavity located 300 m above a small river, develops parallel to the cliff and communicates on the outside by three successive porches under a summit called Ilas KencengThe paintings, very varied, are located in ten particular zones. In addition to the ceiling with bovids, the most remarkable element is a "Bouquet of hands"Luc-Henri Fage's 2003 inventory counts 328 negative hands, 43 representations; mainly anthropomorphs, mammals, and zoomorphs, completed by a few signs (stick, barbed wire signs, etc.). A dating published in 2003 on a calcite formation covering 2 hand-prints had concluded to an age of 9900 years (U/Th combined with C14), which was the first proof of the belonging of this Borneo rock expression to the Pleistocene.
The 2018 team of researchers and scientists, led by Maxime Aubert from the Griffith University, Australia and Pindi Setiawan from the Bandung Institute of Technology, Indonesia had investigated the site, identified and dated the rock paintings as the world's oldest known figurative art and published the results in the Nature journal by the end of the year. The team has since found and dated an elaborate therianthrope rock art panel in the Leang Bulu’ Sipong 4 cave in Sulawesi, to around 44,000 years old, according to a 2019 publication. In order to date the paint pigments, the team applied Uranium series dating techniques on the calcium carbonate (limestone) particles which encrust the depictions.

Importance
The discovery of the cave paintings is important within human cultural history, as it adds to the view that cave art was created simultaneously in Southeast Asia and Europe. However, it is unknown which people created the paintings and what happened to them.

Francesco d'Errico, an expert in prehistoric art at the University of Bordeaux, described the investigation as a "major archaeological discovery", but also suggested that the discovery offered little information on the geographical origins of art.

See also

 Art of the Upper Paleolithic
 List of fossil sites
 List of human evolution fossils
 List of Stone Age art
 Prehistoric art
 Timeline of human evolution

References

External links

 Web site of the Kalimanthrope team
 Prominent Hominid Fossils
 Exploring the Hominid Fossil Record
 Human Timeline (Interactive) – Smithsonian, National Museum of Natural History (August 2016).

East Kutai Regency
Archaeological sites in Indonesia
Caves containing pictograms
Caves of Indonesia
 East
Landforms of East Kalimantan
1994 archaeological discoveries
1994 in Indonesia